The Horizon League women's basketball tournament is the conference championship tournament in women's basketball for the Horizon League. It is a single-elimination tournament involving all of the 10 league schools, and seeding is based on regular-season records with head-to-head match-up as a tie-breaker. The winner receives the conference's automatic bid to the NCAA women's basketball tournament.

In the first round, the #7 seed faces off against the #10 and the #8 faces off against the #9. The #1 and #2 seeds play the winner of those games in the quarterfinals, while the #3 seed faces off against the #6 seed and the #4 seed faces off against the #5 seed.

The tournament has been held since 1989.

Results

Champions

 Northern Kentucky, Oakland, Purdue Fort Wayne, Robert Morris, and Youngstown State have not yet won a Horizon League tournament.
 Dayton, Duquesne, Evansville, Illinois Chicago, La Salle, Loyola Chicago, Marquette, Saint Louis, and Valparaiso never won the tournament as Horizon League members.
 Schools highlighted in pink are former Horizon League members.

See also
 Horizon League men's basketball tournament

References

 
Recurring sporting events established in 1986